Frank Donald Collinge (14 October 1909 – 7 June 1944) was a Canadian fencer. He competed in five events at the 1936 Summer Olympics. He was killed in action during the Second World War.

Personal life
Collinge served as a flying officer in the Royal Canadian Air Force during the Second World War. Serving as a navigator, he was part of the crew of Stirling III LK594. The aircraft lost control and crashed near RAF Saltby during a night training mission on 7 June 1944, killing all on board. Collinge is buried at Harrogate (Stonefall) Commonwealth War Graves Commission Cemetery.

References

External links

1909 births
1944 deaths
Canadian male fencers
Olympic fencers of Canada
Fencers at the 1936 Summer Olympics
Sportspeople from Toronto
Royal Canadian Air Force personnel of World War II
Canadian military personnel killed in World War II
Royal Canadian Air Force officers
Military personnel from Toronto
Burials in North Yorkshire